Roberto Emílio da Cunha, best known as Roberto (born in Niterói, June 20, 1912; died March 20, 1977) was a Brazilian footballer who played as a striker.

In his career (1923–1941) he played for two club teams, Flamengo and São Cristovão. He represented the Brazil national team at the 1938 FIFA World Cup, playing two matches and scoring one goal.

References

1912 births
1977 deaths
Brazilian footballers
Brazil international footballers
Association football forwards
CR Flamengo footballers
1938 FIFA World Cup players